O Tae-geun (오태근, born 12 December 1927) was a South Korean wrestler. He competed at the 1952 Summer Olympics and the 1956 Summer Olympics.

References

External links
 

1927 births
Possibly living people
South Korean male sport wrestlers
Olympic wrestlers of South Korea
Wrestlers at the 1952 Summer Olympics
Wrestlers at the 1956 Summer Olympics
Place of birth missing
20th-century South Korean people